Azania Mosaka (born 18 April 1977), is a South African actress and media personality. She is best known for presenting the "Radio 702".

Personal life
Azania Mosaka was born on 18 April 1977 in Pimville, Soweto, South Africa in a family with three siblings. She grew up only with her mother Ouma Mosaka, who was a nurse. Her father Rabotapi Mosaka left the family when she was small and remarried to Felicity Mosaka. In 2021, Azania and her mother has a legal battle with her late father’s second wife over the division of their joint estate.

She married Tony Ndoro in 2005, but later divorced in 2011 citing personal disagreements. She has one daughter, Shamiso Mosaka, from the marriage. Recently, she dated Sizwe Dhlomo.

Career
She completed her Bachelor’s degree in commerce from the University of Witwatersrand. Then she joined with Vega School of Brand Communication to study media further. In 1996, Azania started her media career by co-hosting for a youth talk show called The Joint aired on now defunct CCV-TV at the age of 18. After a short stint, she then moved to London. In London, she was a hotel receptionist and worked at McDonald's. She returned to South Africa after three years.

After the return, she got the opportunity to work as a presenter for a show Bassiq on Primedia TV in 2015. Then she became the host for e.tv show Backstreet live. Apart from that, she also hosted the shows such as, Total Bliss, The Sound of Breakfast and Real Talk. Even though Azania was selected to take over the show Real Talk, it was later canceled soon after the season. Before leaving "Power FM", she hosted the show Power Lunch. After leaving the FM, she joined with "Radio 702" as a presenter every weekday, which received huge popularity. In 2020, she joined with the SABC1 talk show Zaziwa.

References

Living people
South African television actresses
1977 births
South African television people
South African television personalities